The first Season of X Factor was started in 2010. The auditions were held in April 2010. The first show started on 20 August 2010. The Judges are Sarah Connor (16-24), George Glueck (Groups) and Till Brönner (25+).

There are four phases:
1. Auditions
2. Bootcamp
3. Judge's House
4. Live Shows

Judge's House
The 18 acts who reached the Judge's Houses
Brönner's acts (over 25): Anthony Thet, Denise Modjallal, Sven Merckel, Meral Al-Mer, Edita Abdieski and Alexander Knappe
Connor's acts (16-24): Pino Severino, Mati Gavriel, Hendrik Ehrenthal, Caprice Edwards, Marlon Bertzbach and Maximilian Brands
Gluek's acts (Groups): Drop-Dead-Dinky-Di, Big Soul, Urban Candy, LaFamille, Karma and Predestination

Nine of the 18 acts were eliminated with the 9 remaining moving to the live shows, three from each category. The eliminated acts were:
(Over 25-s): Alexander Knappe, Denise Modjallal, Sven Merckel
(16-24s): Caprice Edwards, Hendrik Ehrental, Maximilian Brands
(Groups): Predestination, Karma, Drop-Dead-Dinky-Di

Contestants

The live shows commenced on 21 September 2010. The following artists made it to the live shows.
Ages are as of the date of the show (2010).

Key:

 – Winner
 – Runner-up
 – Third Place

Big Soul consist of Nadine (28), Alexandra (33), Martina (33), and Michelle (35).LaFamille consist of Joel (35), Erkan (32) & Guido (31).Urban Candy consists of Roman (26), Marc (24) & Candy (25).

Results table 

Contestants' colour key:
{|
|-
| – Till Brönner's contestants (over 25s)   
|-
| – Sarah Connor's contestants (16–24s)      
|-
| – George Glueck's contestants (groups)     
|-
| – Bottom two
|-
| – Eliminated without a final showdown
|-
| – Contestant became the Runner-Up
|-
| – Highest Vote of a Week
|}

Live show details

Week 1 (21 September 2010)
Theme: Playlist 2010
Celebrity Performer: Enrique Iglesias ("I Like It")

Judges' votes to eliminate
Brönner: LaFamille, backed his own act Meral Al-Mer
Connor: LaFamille, due to the lack of surprise and potential
Glueck: Meral Al-Mer, backed his own act LaFamille

Week 2 (28 September 2010)
Theme: Blockbuster Night
Celebrity Performer: Hurts ("Wonderful Life")

Judges' votes to eliminate
Brönner: Pino Severino, backed his own act Meral Al-Mer
Connor: Meral Al-Mer, backed her own act Pino Severino
Glueck: Meral Al-Mer, because of missing singing abilities

Week 3 (5 October 2010)
Theme: King & Queens of Pop
Celebrity Performer: Seal ("Secret")

Judges' votes to eliminate
Brönner: Urban Candy, because they can't deliver their message and don't feel united as a group
Connor: Urban Candy, backed her own act Marlon Bertzbach
Glueck: Marlon Bertzbach, backed his own act Urban Candy

Week 4 (12 October 2010)
Theme: Mystery Night
Celebrity Performers: Usher ("DJ Got Us Fallin' in Love") and Culcha Candela ("Move It")

Judges' votes to eliminate
Brönner: Pino Severino, backed his own act Anthony Thet
Connor: Anthony Thet, backed her own act Pino Severino
Glueck: Pino Severino, because of his second bottom two appearance

Week 5 (19 October 2010)
Theme: Loud vs. Quiet
Celebrity Performers: Till Brönner ("Summer Breeze")

Judge's vote to eliminate
 Brönner: Marlon Bertzbach 
 Connor: Marlon Bertzbach
 Glueck: Marlon Bertzbach

Week 6 (26 October 2010)
Theme: A night at the club
Celebrity Performers: Sarah Connor ("Real Love")

Judge's vote to eliminate
 Brönner: Big Soul, backed his own act Anthony Thet
 Connor: Anthony Thet
 Glueck: Anthony Thet, backed his own act Big Soul

Week 7 (2 November 2010)
Theme: Michael Jackson & Friends
Celebrity Performers: Gossip ("Men in Love") and Flo Rida ("Club Can't Handle Me")
Group Performance: "Over the Rainbow"
The act with the fewest votes was eliminated from the competition.

Week 8 (9 November 2010)
Theme: Final
Celebrity Performers: "Loca" (Shakira) and "Bitte Hör nicht auf zu träumen" (Xavier Naidoo) and "Break my Chains" (Sarah Connor)
Group Performance (Top 9): "Back for Good" 
The Celebrity Guests performed with one act.

External links
 Official German X Factor site

References

Germany 01
2010 German television seasons
2010 German television series debuts